Dam Tang Chendar Chavil (also Romanized as Dam Tang Chendār Chavīl) is a village in Seydun-e Jonubi Rural District, Seydun District, Bagh-e Malek County, Khuzestan Province, Iran. At the 2006 census, its population was 41, in 8 families.

References 

Populated places in Bagh-e Malek County